Braunschweiger may refer to:
Braunschweiger (sausage), the name for several types of sausages
Braunschweiger Kammermusikpodium, classical music festival held in Lower Saxony, Germany
Braunschweiger Land, region in Lower Saxony, Germany
Braunschweiger Mumme, alcoholic beer from Braunschweig, Germany
Braunschweiger Schloss, palace in Braunschweig, Germany
Braunschweiger Schultheaterwoche, German theatre festival
Braunschweiger Zeitung, German newspaper

People 

Braunschweiger Monogrammist, anonymous 16th-century Netherlandish painter
Alfred Braunschweiger (1885–1952), German diver
Amy Braunschweiger, American freelance writer

See also 

Braunschweig (disambiguation)